Javed Ahmad Ghamidi (April 7, 1952) is a Pakistani philosopher, educationist, and scholar of Islam. He is also the founding President of Al-Mawrid Institute of Islamic Sciences and its sister organisation Danish Sara.

He became a member of the Council of Islamic Ideology (responsible for giving legal advice on Islamic issues to the Pakistani Government and the country's Parliament) on 28 January 2006, where he remained for a couple of years. He also taught Islamic studies at the Civil Services Academy for more than a decade from 1979 to 1991. He was also a student of Islamic scholar and exegete, Amin Ahsan Islahi. He is running an intellectual movement similar to Wasatiyyah, on the popular electronic media of Pakistan. Currently he is Principal Research Fellow and Chief Patron of Ghamidi Center of Islamic Learning in United States. Javed Ahmad Ghamidi was named in The Muslim 500 (The World's Most Influential Muslims) in the 2019, 2020 and 2021 editions.

Early life
Javed Ahmed Ghamidi was born as Muhammad Shafique (later he renamed himself as Javed Ghamdi) on 7 April 1952 to a Kakazai family in a village called Jiwan Shah, Arifwala in (District Pakpattan), Punjab, Pakistan. His family village settlement was Dawud in Sialkot. His father, Muhammad Tufayl Junaydi, was a landowner, involved in medicine and a committed follower of tasawwuf until his death in 1986.

Ghamidi and his two elder sisters grew up in a Sufi household. His early education included a modern path (matriculating from Islamia High School, Pakpattan), as well as a traditional path (Arabic and Persian languages, and the Qur'an with  Nur Ahmad of Nang Pal).

His first exposure to traditional Islamic studies was in the Sufi tradition. After matriculating, he came to Lahore in 1967 where he is settled ever since. Initially, he was more interested in Literature and Philosophy. He later graduated from Government College, Lahore, with a BA Honours in English Literature & Philosophy in 1972.

Ghamidi encountered the works of Hamiduddin Farahi, a scholar of the Quran by chance in a library. Finding mention of Amin Ahsan Islahi (who advanced Farahi's thought) in this work inspired Ghamidi to meet Islahi who resided in Lahore during that time. This encounter would change Ghamidi's focus from philosophy and literature, to religion.  In 1973, he came under the tutelage of Amin Ahsan Islahi (d. 1997), who was destined to who have a deep impact on him. He was also associated with scholar and revivalist Abu al-A‘la Mawdudi (d. 1979) for several years. He started working with them on various Islamic disciplines particularly exegesis and Islamic law.

In his book, Maqamat (مقامات), Ghamidi starts with an essay "My Name" (میرا نام) to describe the story behind his surname, which sounds somewhat alien in the context of the Indian Subcontinent. He describes a desire during his childhood years to establish a name linkage to his late grandfather Noor Elahi, after learning of his status as the one people of the area turned to, to resolve disputes. This reputation also led to his (grandfather's) reputation as a peacemaker (مصلح). Subsequently, one of the visiting Sufi friends of his father narrated a story of the patriarch of the Arab tribe Banu Ghamid who earned the reputation of being a great peacemaker. He writes, that the temporal closeness of these two events clicked in his mind and he decided to add the name Ghamidi to his given name, Javed Ahmed. Taxila.

Views

Ghamidi's conclusions and understanding of Islam, including the Sharia, has been presented concisely in his book Mizan with the intention of presenting the religion in its pure shape, cleansed from tasawwuf, qalam, fiqh, all philosophies and any other contaminants.

In his arguments, there is no reference to the Western sources, human rights or current philosophies of crime and punishment. Nonetheless, employing the traditional Islamic framework, he reaches conclusions which are similar to those of Islamic modernists and progressives on the subject.

Jihad

The only valid basis for jihad through arms is to end oppression when all other measures have failed. According to him Jihad can only be waged by an organised Islamic state, that too only where a leader has been nominated by the previous leader or by the consensus of the ulema if the state is newly established. No person, party or group can take arms into their hands (for the purpose of waging Jihad) under any circumstances. Another corollary, in his opinion, is that death punishment for apostasy was also specifically for the recipients of the same Divine punishment during Muhammad's times—for they had persistently denied the truth of Muhammad's mission even after it had been made conclusively evident to them by God through Muhammad.

According to Ghamidi, the formation of an Islamic state is not a religious obligation upon the Muslims per se. However, if and when Muslims do happen to form a state of their own, Islam does impose certain religious obligations on its rulers as establishment of the institutions of salat (obligatory prayer), zakah (mandatory charity), and [[Enjoin what is good and forbid what is wrong|amr bi'l-ma'ruf wa nahi 'ani'l-munkar]] (preservation and promotion of society's good conventions and customs and eradication of social vices); this, in Ghamidi's opinion, should be done in modern times through courts, police, etc. in accordance with the law of the land which, as the government itself, must be based on the opinion of the majority.

Gender interaction
Ghamidi argues that the Qur'an states norms for male-female interaction in Surah An-Nur, while in Surah Al-Ahzab, there are special directives for Muhammad's wives and directives given to Muslim women to distinguish themselves when they were being harassed in Medina.Mizan, Norms of Gender Interaction  He further claims that the Qur'an has created a distinction between men and women only to maintain family relationships.

Penal laws
According to Ghamidi:
 The Islamic punishments of hudud (Islamic law) are maximum pronouncements that can be mitigated by a court of law on the basis of extenuating circumstances.
 The shariah (Divine law) does not stipulate any fixed amount for the diyya (monetary compensation for unintentional murder); the determination of the amount—for the unintentional murder of a man or a woman—has been left to the conventions of society.
 Ceteris paribus (all other things being equal), a woman's testimony is equal to that of a man's.
  Rape is hirabah and deserves severe punishments as mentioned in Quran 5:33. It doesn't require four witnesses to register the case as in the case of Zina (Arabic) (consensual sex). Those who were punished by stoning (rajm) in Muhammad's time were also punished under hirabah for raping, sexually assaulting women, and spreading vulgarity in society through prostitution.جاوید احمد غامدی

Sources of Islam
According to Ghamidi, all that is Islam is constituted by the Qur'an and Sunnah. Nothing besides these two is Islam or can be regarded as part of it. Just like Quran, Sunnah (the way of the prophet) is only what the Muslim nation received through ijma (consensus of companions of the prophet) and tawatur (perpetual adherence of the Muslim nation). Unlike Quran and Sunnah, ahadith only explain and elucidate what is contained in these two sources and also describe the exemplary way in which Muhammad followed Islam. The Sharia is distinguished from fiqh, the latter being collections of interpretations and applications of the Sharia by Muslim jurists. Fiqh is characterised as a human exercise, and therefore subject to human weakness and differences of opinion. A Muslim is not obliged to adhere to a school of fiqh.

Democracy

While discussing the Afghan Taliban, Ghamidi wrote:

Morals and ethics
Ghamidi writes on moral and ethical issues in Islam. He states:After faith, the second important requirement of religion is purification of morals. This means that a person should cleanse his attitude both towards his Creator and towards his fellow human beings. This is what is termed as a righteous deed. All the sharī‘ah is its corollary. With the change and evolution in societies and civilizations, the sharī‘ah has indeed changed; however faith and righteous deeds, which are the foundations of religion, have not undergone any change. The Qur'an is absolutely clear that any person who brings forth these two things before the Almighty on the Day of Judgement will be blessed with Paradise which shall be his eternal abode.

Interaction with other Islamic scholars
Like Wahiduddin Khan, Maulana Naeem Siddiqui, Israr Ahmed and Dr. Khazir Yasin, Ghamidi also worked closely with Maulana Syed Abul Ala Maududi (alternative spelling Syed Maudoodi; often referred to as Maulana Maududi) (1903–1979) and Amin Ahsan Islahi. His work with Maududi continued for about nine years before he voiced his first differences of opinion, which led to his subsequent expulsion from Mawdudi's political party, Jamaat-e-Islami in 1977. Later, he developed his own view of religion based on hermeneutics and ijtihad under the influence of his mentor, Amin Ahsan Islahi (1904–1997), a well-known exegete of the Indian sub-continent who is author of Tadabbur-i-Qur'an, a Tafsir (exegeses of Qur'an). Ghamidi's critique of Mawdudi's thought is an extension of Wahid al-Din Khan's criticism of Mawdudi. Khan (1925–2020 ) was amongst the first scholars from within the ranks of Jamaat-e-Islami to present a full-fledged critique of Mawdudi's understanding of religion. Khan's contention is that Mawdudi has completely inverted the Qur'anic worldview. Ghamidi, for his part, agreed with Khan that the basic obligation in Islam is not the establishment of an Islamic world order but servitude to God, and that it is to help and guide humans in their effort to fulfill that obligation for which religion is revealed. Therefore, Islam never imposed the obligation on its individual adherents or on the Islamic state to be constantly in a state of war against the non-Islamic world. In fact, according to Ghamidi, even the formation of an Islamic state is not a basic religious obligation for Muslims. Despite such extraordinary differences and considering Maududi's interpretation of "political Islam" as incorrect, Ghamidi in one of his 2015 interviews said that he still respects his former teacher like a father.

Ghamidi's thought and discourse community has received some academic attention in the recent past by Pakistani scholar Dr. Husnul Amin whose critical analysis of Ghamidi's thought movement has received academic attention. Amin traces the history of secessionist tendencies within the mainstream Islamism, and its ruptures, and then critically examines Ghamidi's emergence and proliferation in society as an unprecedented phenomenon. Ghamidi's views and discourse on Islam and democracy have also been examined in another cited research paper.

Awards and recognition
In 2009, Ghamidi was awarded Sitara-i-Imtiaz, the third highest civilian honor of Pakistan.

Resignation from Council of Islamic Ideology

Ghamidi resigned in September 2006 from the Council of Islamic Ideology (CII), a constitutional body responsible for providing legal advice on Islamic issues to the Pakistani government. His resignation was 'accepted' by the President of Pakistan. Ghamidi's resignation was prompted by the Pakistani government's formation of a separate committee of ulema to review a Bill involving women's rights; the committee was formed after extensive political pressure was applied by the MMA. Ghamidi argued that this was a breach of the CII's jurisdiction, since the very purpose of the council is to ensure that Pakistan's laws do not conflict with the teachings of Islam. He also said that the amendments in the bill proposed by the Ulema committee were against the injunctions of Islam. This event occurred when the MMA threatened to resign from the provincial and national assemblies if the government amended the Hudood Ordinance, which came into being under Zia-ul-Haq's Islamization. The Hudood Ordinances have been criticised for, among other things, a reportedly difficult procedure to prove allegations of rape.

Public appearances

Ghamidi has appeared regularly on dedicated television programs. His television audience consists of educated, urban-based middle-class men and women between the ages of 20–35, as well as lay Islamic intellectuals and professionals. Ghamidi's religiously oriented audience tends to be dissatisfied with the positions of traditional ulema and Western-educated secular-liberal elite, and find his interventions and ideas more sensible, moderate, and relevant.

Alif on Geo TV (in multiple airings)
Ghamidi on Geo TVLive with Ghamidi on AAJ TV (usually Q/A format but with occasional special programs). The channel also airs other Islamic programs by Javed Ahmad Ghamidi and his associates, such as Aaj Islam.
And other channels like PTV.
Al-Mawrid has video recording setup of its own.Ilm-o-Hikmat, Ghamidi Key Saath (Knowledge and Wisdom with Ghamidi) on Duniya TV.Youtube Channels like Ghamidi Center Of Islamic Learning, Al Mawrid Hind,Javed Ahmad GhamidiCriticism
Some books highly critical of Ghamidi are, Fitna-e-Ghamdiyat by Hafiz Salahuddin Yusuf and Fitna-e-Ghamdiyat ka Ilmi Muhasbah by Muhammad Rafiq.

 Exile from Pakistan 
Ghamidi left Pakistan in 2010 as a result of opposition to his work and threat to his life and his close ones. In a 2015 interview with Voice of America, Ghamidi explained his reason for departure was to safeguard the lives of people near him including his neighbours who had begun to fear for their safety. Some of his close associates had already been killed like Muhammad Farooq Khan and Dr. Habib-ur-Rehman. Ghamidi maintained that his work of education was not affected by his departure because of modern communication. Ghamidi, also regularly appears on Ilm-o-Hikmat, a Pakistani Dunya News show. He has stated his desire to return in the future when circumstances change.

Ghamidi moved to Dallas, Texas, USA as of July 2019, to support establishment of Ghamidi Center of Islamic Learning, an initiative of Al-Mawrid US and an educational institute named after himself.

Publications
Ghamidi’s books include:
English Translation of his works by Dr. Shehzad Saleem:

See also

References

Further reading

 – A comprehensive treatise on the contents of Islam 
 – A dissertation in which contemporary religious thoughts have been critically analysed
—An annotated translation of the Divine message with a view to unfold its coherence

Amin, Husnul (2019). Observing Variants of POST-ISLAMISM: Intellectual Discourses and Social Movements (3rd edition). Islamabad: IRD. p. 310. .
Amin, Husnul (2012). "Post-Islamist Intellectual Trends in Pakistan: Javed Ahmad Ghamidi and His Discourse on Islam and Democracy". Islamic Studies''. 51''': 169–192 – via JSTOR

External links

 , with all his books and Audio/Video lectures
 NON Official Video website
 Profile 
 Link for Al-Mawrid website that contains all of the Javed Ahmed Ghamidi lectures
 TV talk shows with Javed Ahmed Ghamidi
 Debate on Hudood Ordinance: hangingodes.blogspot.com
 Articles available on the internet written by Javed Ahmed Ghamidi. renaissance.com.pk, monthly-renaissance.com
 Resignation of Javed Ahmed Ghamidi from CII; The News International
 The Fundamentalist Moderate; The Boston Globe
 The extremist case for Islamic moderation; Robin Moroney The Wall Street Journal
 An Islamic fundamentalist we can support; Dinesh D'Souza(Stanford University)
 tv-almawrid.org, Audio and Video debates and lectures
 
 .

Living people
1952 births
Pakistani expatriate academics
21st-century Muslim theologians
Pakistani educators
Pakistani exiles
Pakistani theologians
20th-century Muslim theologians
Pakistani Sunni Muslims
Pakistani expatriates in the United States
Quranic exegesis scholars
Government College University, Lahore alumni
Islamic television preachers
Muslim reformers
People from Pakpattan District
Pakistani religious writers